Cajun Justice is an American reality television series on A&E. The series debuted on June 7, 2012.

Despite season one averaging 1.5 million viewers an episode, the newly elected sheriff, Jerry Larpenter, did not agree with the way the series represented his parish. Ken Reichling, creator/executive producer, attempted to keep the show within the parish, and A&E agreed to increase the payment from $1,500 an episode to $10,000 an episode. Larpenter declined the offer.

The Louisiana Auditor's Office reviewed former Sheriff Vernon Bourgeois’ spending in relation to 'Cajun Justice' in January 2013.

Plot summary
The show focuses on the experiences of the Terrebonne Parish, Louisiana Sheriff's Office. The show features most members of the sheriff's office, and also has members of the SWAT team, and other law enforcement agencies on the show. Sheriff Vernon Bourgeois and his deputies arrest and deal with numerous suspects, criminals and other citizens. They often have to solve disputes between neighbors, or have to catch people doing illegal acts on the bayou, such as illegally hunting alligators, among other things.

Episodes

References

2010s American reality television series
2012 American television series debuts
2012 American television series endings
English-language television shows
A&E (TV network) original programming
Television shows set in Louisiana